Educational evaluation is the evaluation process of characterizing and appraising some aspect/s of an educational process.

There are two common purposes in educational evaluation which are, at times, in conflict with one another. Educational institutions usually require evaluation data to demonstrate effectiveness to funders and other stakeholders, and to provide a measure of performance for marketing purposes. Educational evaluation is also a professional activity that individual educators need to undertake if they intend to continuously review and enhance the learning they are endeavoring to facilitate.

Purpose for educational evaluation 
The Joint Committee on Standards for Educational Evaluation published three sets of standards for educational evaluations. The Personnel Evaluation Standards  was published in 1988, The Program Evaluation Standards (2nd edition)  was published in 1994, and The Student Evaluations Standards  was published in 2003.

See also

Notes 
  Joint Committee on Standards for Educational Evaluation. (1988). The Personnel Evaluation Standards: How to Assess Systems for Evaluating Educators. Newbury Park, CA: Sage Publications.
  Joint Committee on Standards for Educational Evaluation. (1994). The Program Evaluation Standards, 2nd Edition. Newbury Park, CA: Sage Publications.
  Committee on Standards for Educational Evaluation. (2003).  The Student Evaluation Standards: How to Improve Evaluations of Students. Newbury Park, CA: Corwin Press.

References

External links 

 OECD's Education GPS: a review of education policy analysis and statistics. Policy analysis in evaluation and quality assurance
 American Evaluation Association
 Topical interest groups (TIGs)
 Assessment in Higher Education
 Distance Education and Other Educational Technologies
 Extension Education Evaluation
 Graduate Student and New Evaluators
 PreK-12 Educational Evaluation
 Teaching of Evaluation
 American Educational Research Association
 Division H School Evaluation & Program Development
 Standards for Educational and Psychological Testing
 Assessment in Higher Education web site.
 Joint Committee on Standards for Educational Evaluation
The EvaluationWiki - The mission of EvaluationWiki is to make freely available a compendium of up-to-date information and resources to everyone involved in the science and practice of evaluation. The EvaluationWiki is presented by the non-profit Evaluation Resource Institute.
 Wisconsin Center for Education Research

Educational administration